Sar Kam Bahmani (also Romanized as Sar Kam Bahmanī and Sar Kam-e Bahmanī; also known as Sarkam, and Sar Kam Bahman) is a village in Howmeh Rural District, in the Central District of Minab County, Hormozgan Province, Iran. At the 2006 census, its population was 388, in 82 families.

References 

Populated places in Minab County